Ivaylo Mihaylov (born 18 January 1991) is a Bulgarian footballer who plays as a midfielder for Yantra Gabrovo.

References

External links
 

1991 births
Living people
Bulgarian footballers
First Professional Football League (Bulgaria) players
Association football midfielders
FC Lokomotiv Gorna Oryahovitsa players
FC Botev Vratsa players
Sportspeople from Pleven